Heynes is a surname. Notable people with the surname include:

Edward Heynes, MP for Devizes
William Heynes (1903-1989), English automotive engineer

See also
Heynen